The Brazilian Historic and Geographic Institute, IHGB, founded on 21 October 1838, is the oldest and traditional authority to promote research and preservation of historical and geographical, cultural and social sciences in Brazil. Its creation, together with the Public Archives of Empire, which amounted to the Imperial Academy of Fine Arts, joined the effort of the conservatives during the regency of Pedro de Araújo Lima to build a strong and centralized imperial state.

History 

Its creation, together with the Public Archives of the Empire, which were added to the Imperial Academy of Fine Arts, integrated the effort of the conservatives for the construction of a strong and centralized imperial state. The IHGB was created with two central guidelines for its work: the collection and publication of documents relevant to the history of Brazil and the encouragement, for public education, of history studies.

The founding assembly was composed of twenty-seven founding members, most of whom, in addition to performing functions within the government, were part of a generation still born in Portugal, compulsorily transferred to Brazil on the occasion of the coming of King John VI to Brazil and educated in Coimbra, thus refractory to the ideals of the French Revolution. This group was dominant in the Institute and in government until the early 1850s, when it was replaced by the generation formed in Brazil. Being located in Rio de Janeiro, headquarters of the court, it was accredited to represent all of Brazil. It brought together in its cadres the cream of society and intellectuals of the time, bringing together local members (50 full members) and from other parts of the country and the world (an unlimited number of corresponding members).

The geography and history commissions were in charge of receiving memoirs, documents and articles, giving their opinion by indicating them to the magazine, to the single publication, or only to the archive. Their publications disseminated a coherent discourse in line with the monarchic ideal.

Bibliography 
ARAÚJO, Valdei Lopes de. A Experiência do Tempo: conceitos e narrativas na formação nacional brasileira (1813-1845). São Paulo: Hucitec, 2008.
DIAS, Fabiana Rodrigues. "Polifonia e consenso nas páginas da Revista do IHGB: a questão da mão de obra no processo de consolidação da nação", História da Historiografia, no. 5, 2010, 175–188.
GONÇALVES, Sérgio Campos. "A figura do intelectual e a razão universal na fundação do Instituto Histórico e Geográfico Brasileiro". Brasiliana - Journal for Brazilian Studies, v. 2, p. 37-69, 2013. 
GUIMARÃES, Lúcia Maria Paschoal. Debaixo da imediata proteção de Sua Majestade Imperial: o Instituto Histórico e Geográfico Brasileiro (1838-1889). RIHGB, Rio de Janeiro, v. 156, nº 388, p. 459-613, jul/set 1995.

See also
Site official IHGB

References 

Historiography of Brazil
Organizations established in 1838
History organisations based in Brazil
Geographic societies
Buildings and structures in Rio de Janeiro (city)
1838 establishments in Brazil